The 2003 NCAA Men's Water Polo Championship was the 35th annual NCAA Men's Water Polo Championship to determine the national champion of NCAA men's collegiate water polo. Tournament matches were played at the Avery Aquatic Center in Stanford, California during December 2003.

USC defeated Stanford in the final, 9–7 (in overtime), to win their second national title. The Trojans (24–3) were coached by Jovan Vavic.

The Most Outstanding Players of the tournament were Tony Azevedo (Stanford), who won the award for a record third straight year, and Bozidar Damjanovic (USC). Azevedo and Damjanovic, along with five other players, also comprised the All-Tournament Team. 

Azevedo, with 8 goals, was also the tournament's leading scorer.

Qualification
Since there has only ever been one single national championship for water polo, all NCAA men's water polo programs (whether from Division I, Division II, or Division III) were eligible. A total of 4 teams were invited to contest this championship.

Bracket
Site: Avery Aquatic Center, Stanford, California

All-tournament team 
Tony Azevedo, Stanford (Most outstanding player)
Bozidar Damjanovic, USC (Most outstanding player)
Predrag Damjanov, USC
Mike Derse, Stanford
Endre Rex-Kiss, Loyola Marymount
Peter Varellas, Stanford
Juraj Zatovic, USC

See also 
 NCAA Men's Water Polo Championship
 NCAA Women's Water Polo Championship

References

NCAA Men's Water Polo Championship
NCAA Men's Water Polo Championship
2003 in sports in California
December 2003 sports events in the United States
2003